CADS may stand for:
Canadian Association for Disabled Skiing, an organization assisting individuals with a disability to participate in recreational and competitive snow skiing and snowboarding
Center for Advanced Defense Studies, a Washington D.C.-based non-governmental national security research group
Corpus-assisted discourse studies, the study, investigation, and comparison of features of particular discourse types
Christ's Amateur Dramatic Society, a student society of Christ's College, Cambridge